North Tongu is one of the constituencies represented in the Parliament of Ghana. It elects one Member of Parliament (MP) by the first past the post system of election. North Tongu is located in the North Tongu district  of the Volta Region of Ghana.

Boundaries
The seat is located within the North Tongu District of the Volta Region of Ghana. It was formed before the 2004 December presidential and parliamentary elections by the division of the old North Tongu constituency into the new North Tongu and Central Tongu constituencies. The boundaries of the present constituency thus differs from the North Tongu constituency of elections prior to 2004.

Members of Parliament

Elections

See also
List of Ghana Parliament constituencies

Notes

References 

Adam Carr's Election Archives
Ghana Web

Parliamentary constituencies in the Volta Region